The 1971–72 Boston Bruins season was the Bruins' 48th season in the NHL. For the second time in three years, the Bruins won the Stanley Cup.

Offseason

NHL Draft

Regular season

Season standings

Schedule and results

Playoffs
Boston defeated the Toronto Maple Leafs 4–1 and the St. Louis Blues 4–0 to advance to the final.

Stanley Cup Final

As of 2022, the 1972 Bruins are the most recent team to have won the Cup without a formal captain. John Bucyk, as the team's senior assistant captain, accepted the Cup and circled the rink in the ceremonial skate.

Boston Bruins vs. New York Rangers

Boston won Stanley Cup 4–2

 Scorer of game-winning goal in italics

Player statistics

Regular season
Scoring

Goaltending

Playoffs
Scoring

Goaltending

Transactions

Awards and records
 Prince of Wales Trophy
 Phil Esposito, Art Ross Trophy Winner  
 Bobby Orr, Conn Smythe Trophy
 Bobby Orr, Norris Trophy

References
 Bruins on Hockey Database

Stanley Cup championship seasons
Boston Bruins seasons
Boston Bruins
Boston Bruins
Boston Bruins
Boston Bruins
Bruins
Bruins